Ryan Dewitte Jackson (born November 15, 1971) is an American professional baseball coach and a former Major League Baseball first baseman and outfielder who played for the Florida Marlins, Seattle Mariners, and Detroit Tigers between 1998 and 2002.

Playing career
Born in Orlando, Florida, Jackson graduated from Cardinal Mooney High School (Sarasota, Florida) and attended Duke University. In 1991, he played collegiate summer baseball with the Harwich Mariners of the Cape Cod Baseball League. Through 2009, he was Duke's all-time season leader in home runs (22), and was second to Nate Freiman in career homers at Duke (42).

He was drafted by the Florida Marlins in the 7th round of the 1994 Major League Baseball Draft. He made his major league debut on March 3, for the Marlins against the Chicago Cubs. He set career-highs in games played, at-bats, home runs, and RBI that year. On April 9, 1999, he was claimed off waivers by the Seattle Mariners. Released after the 1999 season, he signed with the Tampa Bay Devil Rays and spent the entire year with Triple-A Durham. After the 2000 season, Jackson signed with the Detroit Tigers with whom he played for the next two seasons.

On November 6, 2002, Jackson signed with the Devil Rays and spent the whole year in the minors. In 2004, he played 16 games for the Atlanta Braves' Triple-A affiliate, the Richmond Braves.

Coaching career
Jackson began his coaching career at the minor league level in the Cincinnati Reds' organization. In 2007, Jackson became the hitting coach for the Single-A Sarasota Reds, and again served as the hitting coach in 2008. He was named the hitting coach for Double-A Carolina for the 2009 and 2010 seasons, then he assumed the same position for the Triple-A Louisville Bats beginning with the 2011 season, under new manager David Bell. He then served as the Reds' roving  minor league hitting coordinator from 2012 through 2016.

In January 2019, he was named field coordinator for the Boston Red Sox' player development system.

References

External links

1971 births
Living people
American expatriate baseball players in South Korea
Baseball coaches from Florida
Baseball players from Florida
Brevard County Manatees players
Charlotte Knights players
Detroit Tigers players
Duke Blue Devils baseball players
Durham Bulls players
Elmira Pioneers players
Florida Marlins players
Gulf Coast Marlins players
Harwich Mariners players
Kane County Cougars players
KBO League infielders
Lotte Giants players
Major League Baseball first basemen
Major League Baseball outfielders
Portland Sea Dogs players
Richmond Braves players
Seattle Mariners players
Sportspeople from Sarasota, Florida
Tacoma Rainiers players
Toledo Mud Hens players